The Ambassador Extraordinary and Plenipotentiary of the Russian Federation to the Republic of Ecuador is the official representative of the President and the Government of the Russian Federation to the President and the Government of Ecuador.

The ambassador and his staff work at large in the Embassy of Russia in Quito.

History of diplomatic relations

Diplomatic relations between Ecuador and the Soviet Union were established on 16 June 1945, though it was not until November 1969 that the opening of embassies was agreed upon. Both countries began to exchange ambassadors from 1970 onwards. With the dissolution of the Soviet Union in 1991, Ecuador recognised the Russian Federation as its successor state.

List of representatives (1970 – present)

Representatives of the Soviet Union to Ecuador (1970 – 1991)

Representatives of the Russian Federation to Ecuador (1991 – present)

References

 
Ecuador
Russia